Zhang Ning (born 19 May 1975) is a former Chinese badminton player. She won the Olympic gold medal twice for women's singles in both 2004 and 2008. She has played badminton on the world scene since the mid-1990s and has been particularly successful since 2002 while in her late twenties and early thirties, relatively late for singles at the highest level, and especially for top players in the Chinese system who are developed very early. She is known for her consistency of shot, deception and constant pressure, dictating the pace of rallies and working her opponents in all four corners of the court. She is the only female player to win consecutive Olympic singles gold medals. She also became World champion in 2003 and has a total of five medals of all colours in the competition.

Zhang first represented China in the Uber Cup (women's world team championship) competition in 1994 and last represented it in 2006. Though she was not always chosen to play in each of the biennial editions of this tournament, the span of her Uber Cup service is the longest of any Chinese player.

Career

2003
Although she had previously won a number of international open titles dating from the mid-1990s, Zhang's breakthrough as a dominant player on the world circuit came in the 2003 IBF World Championships, where she stormed into the final. There, 28-year-old Zhang Ning defeated compatriot Gong Ruina easily 11-6, 11-3.

2004
The following year, Zhang played badminton at the 2004 Summer Olympics for China.  In women's singles, she defeated Marina Andrievskaya of Sweden and Kelly Morgan of Great Britain in the first two rounds.  In the quarterfinals, Zhang beat Wang Chen of Hong Kong 9-11, 11-6, 11-7 to advance to the semifinals.  There, she defeated countrywoman Zhou Mi 11-6, 11-4.  Zhang defeated Netherlands's Mia Audina 8-11, 11-6, 11-7 in the final to win the gold medal. It was sweet revenge for the 29-year-old, who had lost to Audina 10 years earlier in the decisive match of the Uber Cup. With her Olympic win, she became one of three singles players in the world to win the World Championship and the Olympic Games (in either order) in successive  years, the others being  Susi Susanti and Taufik Hidayat.

2005
Zhang also claimed many titles after her breakthrough wins. She bested Xie Xingfang in the 2005 China Open 3-11, 11-4, 11-8, but in the 2005 World Championships final Zhang fell to Xie Xingfang, 8-11, 11-9, 3-11.

2006
In 2006, Zhang reached the finals of the World Championships yet again, but she was still unable to defeat Xingfang. This time, she lost 16-21, 14-21. However, Zhang claimed revenge in the Japan Open, defeating Xingfang 21-11, 16-21, 30-29. This was the 19th time they had met in an international tournament, with the head-to-head tied at 9-9.

During this year the well known Dutch documentary filmmaker Roel van Dalen made the documentary film Olympic Journey - The Road to Beijing on the life of Zhang Ning, which was broadcast on television worldwide.

2007
In 2007, Zhang won her fifth Singapore Open title in six times, beating Xingfang 21-18, 19-21, 21-3. In the World Championships, Xingfang was defeated in the third round by Malaysian Wong Mew Choo, making Zhang a favourite for the title. However, she was stopped in the semi-finals by Wang Chen. This was the second time Wang Chen had beaten her in 2007, after the Indonesian Open. Zhang's compatriot Zhu Lin went on to beat Wang in the final 21-8, 21-12. In the Beijing Good Luck Invitational tournament, Zhang reached the semi-finals to face Zhu Lin but pulled out due to injury.

In the Danish Open, she reached the final, but lost 17-21, 14-21 to compatriot Lu Lan due to a thigh injury. Zhang also reached the semi-finals of the French Open, but was upset by local hope Pi Hongyan.

In the China Open, Zhang lost in straight sets to Malaysia's Wong Mew Choo in the semi-finals. Zhang cited injury and fatigue as the main reasons for her loss.

2008
Zhang's 2008 season started with a first round loss in the Malaysian Open. She was seen coaching her younger teammates in the tournament as well. In the Korean Open, she lost to her former compatriot, Zhou Mi, in the quarter-final. Zhou now plays for Hong Kong. In the All England, Zhang and Xie, the top 2 seeds, lost in the first round. However they both bounced back strongly in the Swiss Open to reach the final, for their 22nd international meeting. To be in the final was a relief for Zhang, who had failed to get past the quarter-finals in three previous tournaments. Still, Xie beat Zhang 21-18, 21-17, bringing their head-to-head stands to 11:11.

Later, at the Beijing Olympic Games, Zhang progressed to the quarter-final after overcoming South Korean Jun Jae Youn in the third round. She then subdued fifth-seeded Pi Hongyan of France and Indonesia's Maria Kristin Yulianti 21-15, 21-15 to reach the final. There she faced compatriot and world number 1 Xie Xingfang and won in a tough three-setter, 21-12, 10-21, 21-18, to extend her gold medal reign. Zhang became the first badminton player to ever defend an Olympic singles title even though many questioned her ability to do so at the age of 33. She was additionally chosen to represent China as the flag bearer for the 2008 Summer Olympics closing ceremony.

Retirement
Having previously announced her plans to retire after the 2008 Olympic Games, a retirement ceremony for Zhang and other retiring members of the Chinese national team was held at the 2008 China Open Badminton Championships in Shanghai in November 2008. She was in tears receiving an award during the ceremony to mark her retirement with five other teammates from the Chinese national badminton team on the sidelines of the China Open badminton event in Shanghai, November 23, 2008. After her retirement, Zhang Ning immediately began working with the Chinese national team in coaching and developing the up-and-coming women's singles players. In 2018 however she was replaced by Luo Yigang as the coach of China's women's badminton team following the below par performance of team at the Uber Cup.

Achievements

Olympic Games
Women's singles

World Championships 
Women's singles

World Cup 
Women's singles

Asian Championships
Women's singles

Asian Cup
Women's singles

East Asian Games 
Women's singles

Women's doubles

BWF Superseries
The BWF Superseries, launched on 14 December 2006 and implemented in 2007, is a series of elite badminton tournaments sanctioned by the Badminton World Federation (BWF). BWF Superseries has two levels, the Superseries and Superseries Premier. A season of Superseries features twelve tournaments around the world, introduced in 2011, with successful players invited to the BWF Superseries Finals held at the year's end.

Women's singles

  Superseries tournament
  Superseries Premier tournament
  Superseries Finals tournament

IBF World Grand Prix
The World Badminton Grand Prix sanctioned by International Badminton Federation (IBF) from 1983 to 2006.

Women's singles

Women's doubles

Record against selected opponents
Record against year-end Finals finalists, World Championships semi-finalists, and Olympic quarter-finalists.

References

External links
 

1975 births
Living people
Badminton players at the 2004 Summer Olympics
Badminton players at the 2008 Summer Olympics
Badminton players from Liaoning
Olympic badminton players of China
Olympic gold medalists for China
People from Jinzhou
Olympic medalists in badminton
Asian Games medalists in badminton
Medalists at the 2008 Summer Olympics
Medalists at the 2004 Summer Olympics
Badminton players at the 2002 Asian Games
Badminton players at the 2006 Asian Games
Badminton players at the 1998 Asian Games
Chinese female badminton players
Chinese badminton coaches
Asian Games gold medalists for China
Medalists at the 1998 Asian Games
Medalists at the 2002 Asian Games
Medalists at the 2006 Asian Games
World No. 1 badminton players